The Roman Catholic Diocese of Takamatsu is a diocese comprising the island of Shikoku, with its cathedral, Sakuramachi Cathedral Church,  located in the city of Takamatsu. It includes the Japanese prefectures of Kagawa, Ehime, Tokushima and Kōchi. The diocese is in the Ecclesiastical province of Osaka 大阪 in Japan.

History
 January 27, 1904: Established as the Apostolic Prefecture of Shikoku from the Diocese of Osaka
 September 13, 1963: Promoted as the Diocese of Takamatsu

Leadership
 Bishops of Takamatsu
 Bishop John the Apostle Eijiro Suwa (使徒ヨハネ諏訪榮治郎) (June 19, 2011 – September 26, 2022)
 Bishop Francis Xavier Osamu Mizobe (フランシスコ・ザビエル溝部脩), S.D.B. (May 14, 2004 – June 18, 2011)
 Bishop Joseph Satoshi Fukahori (ヨセフ深堀 敏) (July 7, 1977 – May 14, 2004)
 Bishop Franciscus Xaverius Eikichi Tanaka (フランシスコ・ザビエル田中英吉) (September 13, 1963 – 1977)
 Prefects Apostolic of Shikoku 
 Cardinal Paul Yashigoro Taguchi (パウロ田口芳五郎) (November 25, 1941 – 1962)
 Fr. Thomas de la Hoz (トマス・デ・ラ・ホス), O.P. (Apostolic Administrator 1932 – 1935)

See also

Roman Catholicism in Japan

References

Notes

Sources
 GCatholic.org
 Catholic Hierarchy
  Diocese website

External links 
 Diocese of Takamatsu at Catholic Bishops Conference of Japan website 
 Diocese of Takamatsu at Catholic Bishops Conference of Japan website (in Japanese)

Roman Catholic dioceses in Japan
Christian organizations established in 1904
Roman Catholic dioceses and prelatures established in the 20th century